Ulvu Ganizade is an Azerbaijani Greco-Roman wrestler. He won the silver medal in the 72 kg event at the 2022 World Wrestling Championships held in Belgrade, Serbia. He is also a two-time bronze medalist at the European Wrestling Championships.

Career 

He won one of the bronze medals in the 72 kg event at the 2020 European Wrestling Championships held in Rome, Italy.

At the 2021 U23 World Wrestling Championships held in Belgrade, Serbia, he won one of the bronze medals in the 72 kg event.

He also won one of the bronze medals in the 72 kg event at the 2022 European Wrestling Championships held in Budapest, Hungary. He won the silver medal in his event at the 2021 Islamic Solidarity Games held in Konya, Turkey.

Achievements

References

External links 

 

Living people
Year of birth missing (living people)
Place of birth missing (living people)
Azerbaijani male sport wrestlers
European Wrestling Championships medalists
World Wrestling Championships medalists
Islamic Solidarity Games competitors for Azerbaijan
Islamic Solidarity Games medalists in wrestling
21st-century Azerbaijani people